The Penang State Assembly Building is the home of the Penang State Legislative Assembly. It is located at Light Street in the city of George Town in Penang, Malaysia, within the city's UNESCO World Heritage Site. All State Legislative Assembly proceedings are held within the building

Built in the 1820s, the Anglo-Indian classical style building originally served as part of George Town's Central Police Station. It was only in 1959 when the building was converted into the current home of the State Legislative Assembly.

Architecture

The Penang State Assembly Building was designed in the Anglo-Indian classical style, and contains elements of classical Greek and Palladian architectures. For instance, the massive white colonnades supporting a large pediment were inspired by ancient Greek temples.

History
The building now known as the Penang State Assembly Building was built sometime in the 1820s, although its exact date of construction has not been determined. As with many other buildings of that particular period, this building was constructed by convict labourers sent from India.

Originally, the building was part of George Town's Central Police Station, housing the Recorder's and Magistrate's Courts. It was renovated in 1874, while another administrative building was added to the police complex in 1890.

The building retained its judicial function until 1959, when it was finally converted for use by the newly-formed Penang State  Legislative Assembly. The conversion of the building into the present-day State Assembly Building cost $150,000 (Malaya and British Borneo dollar).

See also
 Penang State Legislative Assembly

References

Buildings and structures in George Town, Penang
Penang State Legislative Assembly
Government of Penang
Legislative buildings